The United States's Phalanx nuclear test series was a group of 18 nuclear tests conducted in 1982–1983. These tests  followed the Operation Praetorian series and preceded the Operation Fusileer series.

References

Explosions in 1982
Explosions in 1983
1982 in military history
1983 in military history
Phalanx